Casper's Scare School is a computer-animated television film starring Casper the Friendly Ghost.

Casper's Scare School may also refer to:

Casper's Scare School (TV series), a 2009 children's television series
Casper's Scare School (video game), a 2008 PlayStation 2 adventure game